The 1998–99 Macedonian Second Football League was the seventh season since its establishment. It began in August 1998 and ended in May 1999.

East

Participating teams

League standing

West

Participating teams

League standing

See also
1998–99 Macedonian Football Cup
1998–99 Macedonian First Football League

References

External links
Football Federation of Macedonia 
MacedonianFootball.com 

Macedonia 2
2
Macedonian Second Football League seasons